Uchida (written: 内田 lit. "within ricefield") is a Japanese surname. Notable people with the surname include:

Aguri Uchida (born 1949), a Japanese watercolour painter
Akiko Uchida (born 1985), a Japanese volleyball player
Asahi Uchida (born 1982), a Japanese actor
Atsuto Uchida, a Japanese football player
Aya Uchida (born 1986), a Japanese voice actress
, Japanese footballer
Hyakken Uchida, (1889–1971), a Japanese author and academic
Irene Uchida (1917–2013), Canadian scientist and researcher
Jun Uchida, a Japanese football player
Uchida Kakichi (1866–1933), a Japanese politician
Kaichi Uchida, a Japanese tennis player
Katherine Uchida (born 1999), a Canadian rhythmic gymnast
Kenji Uchida, a Japanese anime producer
Kenji Uchida (film director), a Japanese film director
Kenta Uchida, a Japanese football player
, Japanese footballer
Uchida Kosai (1865–1936), a Japanese statesman
Uchida Kuichi (1844–1875), a Japanese photographer
Makoto Uchida, a Japanese video game programmer
Maaya Uchida (内田 真礼, born 1989), a Japanese actress
Minoru Uchida (born 1927), a Japanese actor
Mitsuko Uchida (born 1948), a Japanese-born classical pianist 
Naoya Uchida (born 1953), a Japanese actor
Robert Uchida (born 1979), a Canadian violinist
Uchida Ryogoro (1837–1921), a Japanese jojutsu practitioner
Ryōhei Uchida (1873–1937), a Japanese nationalist and political theorist
Uchida Ryu Tanjojutsu, the martial arts school Uchida Ryogoro devised
Sadatsuchi Uchida (1865–1942), a Japanese consul general to the United States
Sho Uchida (born 1987), a Japanese freestyle swimmer
Shoji Uchida (born 1949), a Japanese modern pentathlete, competitor at the 1976 and 1984 Summer Olympics
Shungicu Uchida (born 1959), a Japanese manga artist and novelist
, Japanese footballer
, Japanese footballer
Tomoya Uchida (born 1983), a Japanese football player
Tomu Uchida (1898–1970), a Japanese filmmaker
Yosh Uchida (born 1920), American businessman and judoka
Yoshikazu Uchida (1885–1972), a Japanese architect and structural engineer
Yoshiko Uchida (1921–1992), a Japanese American writer
, Japanese actress, idol, singer and model
Yuya Uchida (singer) (1939-2019), a Japanese actor and singer
Yūya Uchida (voice actor) (born 1965), a Japanese voice actor

See also
Uchida Station, railway station in Aka, Fukuoka
Uchida (brand), an electronics brand name of Maspion

Japanese-language surnames